Hot Charity/Cut Carefully and Play Loud is an album by American punk rock band Rocket from the Crypt, released in 2002 by Swami Records. It combines two of the band's out-of-print vinyl releases, the 1995 LP Hot Charity and 1999 EP Cut Carefully and Play Loud, into a single release on CD. It includes liner notes by singer/guitarist John Reis detailing the recordings of both releases.

Track listing
"Pushed"
"Guilt Free"
"Poison Eye"
"My Arrow's Aim"
"Feathered Friends"
"Cloud Over Branson"
"Lorna Doom"
"Shucks"
"Pity Yr Paws"
"If the Bird Could Fly"
"Blood Robots"
"Waste It"
"Hot Wired"
"Who Let the Snakes In??"

Tracks 1–9 comprise the LP Hot Charity
Tracks 10–14 comprise the EP Cut Carefully and Play Loud

Performers
Speedo (John Reis) – guitar, lead vocals
ND (Andy Stamets) – guitar, backing vocals
Petey X (Pete Reichert) – bass, backing vocals
Apollo 9 (Paul O'Beirne) - saxophone, percussion, backing vocals
JC 2000 (Jason Crane) - trumpet, percussion, backing vocals
Atom (Adam Willard) – drums

Album information
Record label: Swami Records
Hot Charity originally produced by Sally Browder
Cut Carefully and Play Loud originally produced by John Reis and recorded by Gar Wood at Box Studios in San Diego
Original layout of Hot Charity by Mark Waters
Graphics redesigned by Dave Lively
Remastered by Dave Gardener at Magneto Mastering

References

Rocket from the Crypt albums
2002 compilation albums
Swami Records compilation albums